The Black Diaries are diaries purported to have been written by the Irish revolutionary Roger Casement, which contained accounts of homosexual liaisons with young men. They cover the years 1903, 1910 and 1911 (two) and were handed in to Scotland Yard after his capture in April 1916.

Casement was charged with treason following the Easter Rising. During his trial the prosecution (F. E. Smith) suggested to the defence barrister (A. M. Sullivan) that they should jointly produce the diaries in evidence, as this would most likely cause the court to find Casement "guilty but insane", and save his life. Casement refused, and was found guilty and condemned to death.

The British government then began to circulate photographic page copies to block any appeals or requests for clemency, particularly from the U.S., that showed his "sexual degeneracy". The effect of their circulation was to dissuade some would-be supporters from joining an appeal for clemency, and Casement was hanged on 3 August 1916.

Details
The term Black Diaries was coined by Peter Singleton-Gates and Maurice Girodias in their 1959 book of that name. A second set of journals kept by Casement in 1910 is known as the White Diaries or Amazon Journal.

The debate over the diaries' validity started in 1936 with William J. Maloney's book, The Forged Casement Diaries, in which he claimed to have proved that the British authorities had forged the diaries in order to discredit Casement. The possibility was suggested that forgers used a diary full of depravities written by a man Casement was investigating in Peru in 1911, that was transcribed by Casement and then by the forgers. The poet W. B. Yeats was moved by this book to write a poem, "Roger Casement", which he described as "a ferocious ballad". Another poet, Alfred Noyes, who had accepted the diaries as genuine in 1916, also criticised the establishment in a 1957 book, The Accusing Ghost or Justice for Casement.

In 1959 Peter Singleton-Gates and Maurice Girodias published The Black Diaries—a version of the diaries which they described as being based on "a bundle of documents" given to Singleton-Gates in 1922 by "a person of some authority"—in Paris, where they could not be prosecuted under the Official Secrets Act. That person was most likely Sir Basil Thomson who on his dismissal from Scotland Yard apparently removed large quantities of official papers. The diaries were released by the British government the same year, when they were made available in the Public Record Office in London.

In 1960 Roger McHugh doubted the diaries' veracity, commenting on: "suspicious internal discrepancies and contradictions which hint toward the hand of a forger and the diary's physical evolution from the descriptions of eyewitnesses in 1916 to the physical appearance of the diaries made available in 1959".

In 1965 The Trial of Sir Roger Casement, a book by H. Montgomery Hyde, was banned by the Irish Censorship of Publications Board because the diary extracts in it were found to be "indecent or obscene".

In 1993 a Home Office expert Dr. David Baxendale made a report featured in a BBC Radio 4 documentary. Dr. Baxendale stated that "the bulk of the handwriting in there is the work of Roger Casement". With reference to alleged interpolations he stated: "the handwriting of all the entries which were of that nature correspond closely with Mr Casement's handwriting."

In 1994 Eoin O'Máille attempted to analyse the use of words in the white and black diaries, to establish if the latter were written by Casement, but the result was criticised by Hugh Casement for using "a computer programme which was designed to tell the 'reading age' of North American schoolchildren ... Linguistic analysis is something a little more subtle than that!"

At the turn of the 21st century a forensic examination of the diaries was commissioned by Bill McCormack, Professor of Literary History at Goldsmiths College, University of London. The documents were examined by Audrey Giles, a leading forensic handwriting examiner, who concluded, according to a report in The Guardian, that "the handwriting, ink, paper, pen strokes and pencillings were all genuine." McCormack published a book on Maloney and the diaries in 2002. The Royal Irish Academy formally published The Giles Report in 2005.

Also in 2002 Professor Daniel Vangroenweghe's examination of Casement's time in the Congo was published. He is a Belgian historian of the Congo Free State period, and argues closely that Casement's use of Kikongo slang, and some entries about people and places in 1903, could not have been known in London in 1916. Finally he quotes from the unpublished autobiography of John Harris, who was shown the diary in 1916: "I was so firmly convinced, that the diary was not Roger Casement's handiwork. Alas, when it was put before me and I had examined certain parts, my confidence was shaken. Then I came upon two or three facts only known in Europe to Casement and myself, and then my hopes were ...".

Two US forensic-document examiners later peer-reviewed the 2005 Giles Report; both were critical of it. James Horan stated, "As editor of the Journal of Forensic Sciences and The Journal of the American Society of Questioned Document Examiners, I would not recommend publication of the Giles Report because the report does not show how its conclusion was reached. To the question, 'Is the writing Roger Casement's?' on the basis of the Giles Report as it stands, my answer would have to be I cannot tell." Marcel Matley, a second document examiner, stated, "Even if every document examined were the authentic writing of Casement, this report does nothing to establish the fact."

In 2016 16 Lives: Roger Casement by Angus Mitchell summarised his long held views that the diaries were forgeries.

In 2016 the University of Notre Dame published Paul Hyde's monograph, which concludes that both sides of the dispute have outstanding issues to address: "the dominant and 'official' theory of the authenticity of the Black Diaries, in force for almost one hundred years, has almost no explanatory power whatsoever. It fails to answer the most basic and persistent questions ... Those who believe that the Black Diaries are forged do not have their belief supported by facts proven beyond reasonable doubt."

All the diaries, including for the first time the 1911 volume which contained the most prolonged sexual narrative, were published by Jeffrey Dudgeon the same year. A second, extended, paperback and electronic edition was published in 2016.

Peruvian writer and 2010 Nobel laureate in literature Mario Vargas Llosa, in the epilogue to his novel The Dream of the Celt which is based on Casement's life, expresses his opinion – "as a writer, and claiming no expertise" – that Casement did write the diaries, but that much of their content described his erotic fantasies rather than actual sexual experiences.

References

External links
 'Roger Casement', by W. B. Yeats, on Wikisource
Diaries of Roger Casement held at The National Archives, London
Photocopies of the diaries held at Churchill Archives Centre, Cambridge

Easter Rising
Diaries
LGBT history in the United Kingdom